{{Infobox concert tour
| concert_tour_name = The World Contamination Tour
| image             = Wikimcrnotts.jpg
| image_caption     = (Left to right) Frank Iero, Mikey Way, Gerard Way & Ray Toro @ Nottingham Capital FM Arena 19th Feb 2011
| artist            = My Chemical Romance
| album             = Danger Days: The True Lives of the Fabulous Killjoys
| start_date        = October 23, 2010
| end_date          = May 12, 2012
| number_of_legs    = 7
| number_of_shows   = 41 in North America48 in Europe4 in Japan9 in Oceania ''102 in total
| last_tour         = The Black Parade World Tour(2007–2008)
| this_tour         = The World Contamination Tour(2010–2012)
| next_tour         = Honda Civic Tour 2011(2011)
}}The World Contamination Tour was a concert tour supporting My Chemical Romance's fourth album Danger Days: The True Lives of the Fabulous Killjoys. This was the first tour My Chemical Romance had done since the departure of their drummer Bob Bryar. For the tour, Michael Pedicone was the stand-in drummer.

 Support acts 
Twin Atlantic (Europe—Leg 1) (select dates)
Lostalone (Europe—Leg 2)
The Blackout (Europe—Leg 2) (select dates)
Architects (North America—Leg 2)
Bring Me the Horizon (North America—Leg 2) (select dates)
Anti-Flag  (North America—Leg 2) (Toronto and Montreal) 
Thursday (North America—Leg 2) (select dates)
Circa Survive (North America—Leg 2) (select dates)

 Setlist 
The band's setlist contained mostly songs from Danger Days, but also from their other three albums. There was not a steady setlist the band used, although the song Na Na Na (Na Na Na Na Na Na Na Na Na) was used as the intro to all shows.

Tour dates

Festivals and other miscellaneous performancesA This concert is a part of the 101.9 RXP Yule Rock Holiday Concert Show.B This concert is a part of 9X's NBT 10.C This concert is a part of the KRBZ's The Night the Buzz Stole Xmas show.D This concert is a part of LIVE 105's Not So Silent Night.E This concert is a part of 91X's Wrex the Halls.F This concert is a part of KPNT 105.7's The Pageant.G This concert is a part of Q101’S Twisted Show.H This concert is a part of The Edge Jingle Bell Rock 2010I This concert is a part of Radio 1's Big Weekend.J This concert is a part of the Orange Warsaw festival.K These concerts are a part of the Hurricane and Southside festivals. L This concert is a part of the DCode Festival.M This concert is a part of the Sonisphere festival.N This concert is a part of the Volt Festival.O This concert is a part of the Rock Werchter Festival.P This concert is a part of the Rock For People festival.Q This concert is a part of the Optimus Alive! festival.R This concert is a part of the Oxegen festival.S This concert is a part of the iTunes FestivalT This concert is a part of the T in the Park festival.U These concerts are a part of the Reading and Leeds festivals.V This concert is a part of the Rock en Seine festival.
Cancelled shows

 Personnel My Chemical Romance  Frank Iero — rhythm guitar, backing vocals
 Ray Toro — lead guitar, backing vocals
 Gerard Way — lead vocals
 Mikey Way — bass
 James Dewees — Synth, keyboards and percussionAdditional musicians'''
 Michael Pedicone — drums

References

External links 
 My Chemical Romance tour dates
 My Chemical Romance at MySpace

My Chemical Romance concert tours
2010 concert tours
2011 concert tours